"Civil War: The Initiative" is a comic book branding as well as a one-shot comic book starting this event, published by Marvel Comics. An epilogue to Marvel's Civil War event, the branding promotes newly launched series such as the Mighty Avengers, New Avengers, and Omega Flight, as well as the Warren Ellis reinvention of Thunderbolts.

The one-shot is written by Brian Michael Bendis and Warren Ellis, with pencil art by Marc Silvestri. Centered on Iron Man, its story is divided into three segments. In the first segment, mutant Michael Pointer (The Collective), the man who killed the Canadian superhero team Alpha Flight while under the control of a being claimed by Magneto to be Xorn, is given a chance to atone for his actions. The second segment (written by Warren Ellis) showcases the Thunderbolts, conscripted supervillains working for the government, in pursuit of unregistered superhumans. The third and final segment shows a meeting between Ms. Marvel, a staunch ally of Iron Man, and Spider-Woman, one of Captain America's Secret Avengers.

In addition to the main story, the comic includes promotional previews for other titles linked to Civil War – Iron Man, Captain America, Mighty Avengers, Omega Flight and Avengers: The Initiative.

List of comics
The following is a list of comic books that carry The Initiative banner:
Avengers: The Initiative #1–3
Black Panther vol. 4, #26–30
Captain America vol. 5, #25–30
Fantastic Four #544–550
Iron Man Vol.4 #15–18
Mighty Avengers #1–6
Moon Knight vol. 5, #11–13
Ms. Marvel vol. 2, #13–17
New Avengers #28–31
New Warriors vol. 4, #1–8
Nova vol. 4, #2–3
Omega Flight #1–5
The Order #1–4
Punisher War Journal vol. 2, #6–11
Sub-Mariner vol. 2, #1–6
Thunderbolts #112–115

Comics by Brian Michael Bendis